This is a list of notable companies based in New Zealand, a country in Oceania. For further information on the types of business entities in this country and their abbreviations, see "Business entities in New Zealand".

New Zealand is a wealthy country, with a relatively high GDP per capita and a relatively low rate of poverty. Since the 1980s, New Zealand has transformed from an agrarian, regulated economy to a more industrialised, free market economy that can compete globally. Since 1984, government subsidies including for agriculture have been eliminated; import regulations have been liberalised; exchange rates have been freely floated; controls on interest rates, wages, and prices have been removed; and marginal rates of taxation reduced. The restructuring and sale of state-owned enterprises in the 1990s reduced government's role in the economy. Many of the largest companies lost ground and new enterprises were established. New Zealand companies are dependent on international trade, mainly with Australia, the European Union, the United States, China, South Korea, Japan and Canada. The major capital market is the New Zealand Exchange, known as the NZX.

Largest firms
95% of the companies entirely within New Zealand are classed as small and medium-sized enterprises (SMEs). The Financial Reporting Act 1993 defines a large company as one that satisfied at least one of two criteria:
Total assets of the entity and its subsidiaries (if any) exceed NZ$60 million
Total revenue of the entity and its subsidiaries (if any) exceeds NZ$30 million.

Several of the largest firms are listed below:

Notable firms 
This list includes notable companies with primary headquarters located in the country. The industry and sector follow the Industry Classification Benchmark taxonomy. Organizations which have ceased operations are included and noted as defunct.

For convenience, the word "Limited", which every company registered or re-registered under the Companies Act 1993 must have at the end of its name, is reduced to the common and universally recognized term "Ltd", which is a specifically permitted abbreviation under the Act. In the New Zealand registration system, unlike those of some other countries, the term "Incorporated" is restricted to societies (generally nonprofit) under the Incorporated Societies Act 1908.

See also 

 List of companies listed on the New Zealand Exchange
 List of South Island companies
 New Zealand Companies Office
 NZX 50 Index – the main stock market index in New Zealand
 State-owned enterprises of New Zealand

References

External links 
 Motor Vehicle Traders Register at Ministry of Business, Innovation and Employment
 Companies Office Registry

 
New Zealand